Plexaurella is a genus of gorgonian-type octocorals in the family Plexauridae. Species of the genus are typically characterised by their slit-pores, however, there are some which lack this distinguishing feature (e.g. P. grisea). Sclerite examination is necessary for species identification, which reveals the characteristic 4-rayed 'butterfly' spicules of the cortex and the lack of purple sclerites in the axial sheath.

Species
The World Register of Marine Species lists the following species in the genus:

Plexaurella crassa (Ellis, 1756)
Plexaurella curvata Kunze, 1916
Plexaurella dichotoma (Esper, 1791)
Plexaurella furcata (Lamarck, 1816)
Plexaurella grandiflora Verrill, 1912
Plexaurella grisea Kunze, 1916
Plexaurella heteropora (Lamarck, 1816)

Plexaurella kunzei Kükenthal, 1916>
Plexaurella minuta Kunze, 1916
Plexaurella nutans (Duchassaing & Michelotti, 1860)
Plexaurella regia Barreira e Castro, 1986
Plexaurella tenuis Kunze, 1916
Plexaurella teres Kunze, 1916
Plexaurella vermiculata (Lamarck, 1816)

References

Plexauridae
Octocorallia genera